Harry Borrer Kirk (9 March 1859 – 15 July 1948) was a New Zealand school inspector, biologist and university professor.

Public life 
He was born in Coventry, Warwickshire, England on 9 March 1859 to Sarah Jane Mattocks and Thomas Kirk. The family emigrated to New Zealand arriving in Auckland on 9 February 1863 and Wellington in 1874 when Thomas Kirk was appointed to Wellington College. Harry studied for University of New Zealand exams at home, gaining a BA in 1882 and a MA 1883, after which he joined the Department of Education first as a clerk and then as an inspector of native schools. As an inspector, he spend almost two decades traveling the country, collecting botanical specimens as he went.

As was typical at the time, Kirk saw Pākehā education as a force for 'elevating' Māori. The 1880 Native Schools Code held that te reo Māori was only to be used to 'learn English more effectively' and Kirk stated in a report:

In 1903 Kirk was appointed inaugural chair of biology to Victoria College (now Victoria University of Wellington) and he largely devoted the rest of his life to building up the biology capabilities of the university.

During the First World War he produced several innovations in military camps for to reduce fly contamination, and he is said to have refused a Captain's commission.

Family life 
Kirk married Annie Lamont (or La Monte) on 10 July 1885 in Dunedin. They had two children Ethelwin Gladys Kirk (died 1957) and Hilda Gyneth Hall (died 1973), both of whom are buried in Karori Cemetery next to Kirk's parents. His wife Annie died in March 1927. After he retired in 1944, he was cared for by his unmarried sister Cybele Kirk, who had been active, along with their sister Lily May Kirk, in the women's suffrage movement. The family were active in the Baptist Union of New Zealand, with Harry being a listed as a Mortgagee in the Baptist Union Incorporation Act 1923

Death 
Kirk died at Waikato Hospital in Hamilton on 15 July 1948. He had been at Tauranga with leg fracture which did not heal properly.

Legacy 
Two buildings on the Kelburn campus of Victoria University of Wellington are named after Kirk, called the Kirk Building and the Old Kirk Building

Positions 
 Original fellow of the New Zealand Institute (renamed the Royal Society of New Zealand after the royal charter) 1919
 President of the Wellington Philosophical Society in 1907–1908
 President of the New Zealand Institute in 1922–23
 Founding member of the University Reform Association
 Senate of the University of New Zealand 1915 to 1920
 Academic board of the University of New Zealand 1930 to 1944
 chairman of the Committee of Management of the Dominion Museum (new Museum of New Zealand Te Papa Tongarewa)

References

1859 births
1948 deaths
New Zealand biologists
Academic staff of the Victoria University of Wellington
School inspectors
People from Coventry
English emigrants to New Zealand
Presidents of the Royal Society of New Zealand
Fellows of the Royal Society of New Zealand
New Zealand Baptists
People associated with the Museum of New Zealand Te Papa Tongarewa